Tripartite motif-containing protein 9 is a protein that in humans is encoded by the TRIM9 gene.

The protein encoded by this gene is a member of the tripartite motif (TRIM) family. The TRIM motif includes three zinc-binding domains, a RING, a B-box type 1 and a B-box type 2, and a coiled-coil region. The protein localizes to cytoplasmic bodies. Its function has not been identified. Alternate splicing of this gene generates two transcript variants encoding different isoforms.

Interactions
TRIM9 has been shown to interact with SNAP-25.

References

Further reading